Debris documentar (English: Debris Documentation) is a 75-minute 2012 German-language experimental independent dramatic art film, made in 2003 by Marian Dora.

Synopsis
The film, released on DVD in 2014 as part of a boxset also containitng Melancholie der Engel (2009) and Reise nach Agatis (2010), deals with the everyday life of a man, Carsten, who works on the set of the 2004 Ulli Lommel film Zombie Nation. At the same time, he is planning to realize his own film, a task he finds extremely difficult. First, he tries to place casting ads in a supermarket. During his daily work on the film set, the man seems frustrated. Also, he is isolated in his private life, and spends his time by watching and masturbating to his opulent VHS film collection of homosexual rape pornography and films such as Cesare Canevari’s 1977 Gestapo’s Last Orgy, Dennis Donnelly's 1978 The Toolbox Murders, Werner Herzog’s 1974 The Enigma of Kaspar Hauser, Peter Schamoni’s 1976 , and Rino Di Silvestro’s 1976 Werewolf Woman, and tinkering with props for his own planned film. He also likes to read Astrid Proll’s works about Andreas Baader and Ulrike Meinhof and the writings of Eduard Mörike. In his spare time, he shoots photos of animal cadavers while playing with them, also partly collecting them to take home with him, as he seems to have sexual attraction to them, and rapes women (Martina Adora, Stefanie Müller, and Carina Palmer) in the woods while they urinate. He indulges in several disturbing sexual fetishes including defecating, urinating, necrophilia, bestiality, anal fisting, rape, murder, nose-picking, and other unspeakable acts. He is in regular contact with a prostitute, Patrizia (Patrizia Johann), who puts an enema into her anus and defecates into a bucket while placing the man onto a table, shoving her fist into his anus and pulling feces out of there while he is putting the bucket to his face. By telephone, he also stays in contact with Jesús Franco, Peter Martell, and David Hess (who composed most of this film's score). After a while, he actually contacted a woman, Franziska (Alexandra Dumas), who read his advertisement in the supermarket. They arrange a meeting in the man's house. When he tells her what he is supposed to do in his film, the woman gets scared and wants to leave the house. Then, Carsten overwhelms her and kills her by strangling her with a telephone cord and beating her head. Afterwards, he films himself as he is sexually aroused by her corpse. He cuts her nipples off in graphic detail and uses his scalpel to cut the dead woman's clitoris off. He then takes the scalpel and peels the skin off one of her fingers and eats the pieces of dismembered skin. The film ends with a scene showing Carsten burning the same woman's body and going jogging, as in the first shot of this film.

References

External links

 (BUT (B-Movies, Underground, and Trash) Film Festival's Channel) 

2012 films
2010s avant-garde and experimental films
2010s drama road movies
2012 independent films
2012 LGBT-related films
Films about cannibalism
Films about couples
Films about films
Films about gay male pornography
Films about murderers
Films about prostitution in Germany
Films about rape
Films about vacationing
Films about violence against women
Films directed by Marian Dora
Films set in department stores
Films set in forests
Films set in Croatia
Films set in Germany
Films set on beaches
Films shot in Croatia
Films shot in Germany
German drama road movies
German independent films
2010s German-language films
German LGBT-related films
Greek avant-garde and experimental films
Greek drama films
Greek LGBT-related films
LGBT-related drama films
Masturbation in fiction
Necrophilia in film
Sailing films
Torture in films
Women and death
Works published under a pseudonym
Zoophilia in culture
2012 drama films
2010s German films